Gwendal Peizerat (born 21 April 1972) is a French former competitive ice dancer. With Marina Anissina, he is the 2002 Olympic champion, the 1998 Olympic bronze medalist, the 2000 World champion, and a six-time French national champion.

Personal life 
Both of Gwendal Peizerat's parents were involved in figure skating, his father serving as the general secretary of the French federation and his mother in charge of a club in Lyon. His sister is two years older.

Peizerat holds a management degree from EMLYON Business School, a DEUG in materials science, and a maîtrise in STAPS from Claude Bernard University Lyon 1. He has two daughters, Shanelle (born in 2012), and Lilas (born 21 December 2013). He released a single "Baby Rock" in 2014.

Skating career

Early years
Peizerat started skating at age four when he and his sister followed their parents to the ice rink. He went into ice dancing straight away. He was coached by Muriel Boucher-Zazoui since the age of six and throughout his entire career.

Boucher-Zazoui paired seven-year-old Peizerat with his first partner, French skater Marina Morel, who was the same age as him; Morel and Peizerat skated together for fourteen years. They won bronze at the 1989 World Junior Championships and then silver in 1991. Morel retired in 1992.

Partnership with Anissina
Following the end of his partnership with Morel, Peizerat responded to a letter he had received a few months earlier from Russian World Junior champion Marina Anissina, who chose him after watching competitions on video.

Anissina arrived in Lyon in February 1993 and wanted to take him to Russia but his family objected. She settled in France, focusing intensely on skating and insisting her partner, who was dividing his time between skating and his education, be equally focused on their career. Their first year together produced many quarrels and they came close to splitting up. Their coach Muriel Boucher-Zazoui, however, immediately felt it was a promising partnership, saying "They are like fire and ice".

Anissina and Peizerat were selected for the 1994 Winter Olympics in Lillehammer but her French citizenship was granted a few weeks too late. The Olympics, unlike most skating competitions, require both partners to be citizens of the country they are representing.

Anissina and Peizerat won the 1998 Olympic bronze medal and 1998 and 1999 World silver medals behind Anjelika Krylova and Oleg Ovsyannikov. The Russians retired due to injury and Anissina and Peizerat then developed a rivalry with the Italians Barbara Fusar-Poli and Maurizio Margaglio. The French won the 2000 European and World Championships.

In 2001, Anissina and Peizerat won European and World silver behind the Italians but surged past them in 2002 to reclaim their European title and become the Olympic Champions. At the 2002 Olympics, they led after the compulsory dances and the original dance. Their free dance, "Liberty", mixed music with sections from the famed freedom speech by Martin Luther King Jr.; a 5-4 split of the judges' panel had them in first place in this segment ahead of Irina Lobacheva and Ilia Averbukh, and they became the first French ice dancers to win the Olympic gold medal.

After the Olympics, Anissina and Peizerat retired from competition but continued skating together for many years in shows around the world. During their career, they represented the club Lyon TSC. Their signature move was Anissina lifting Peizerat off the ice, switching the traditional gender roles in lifts. 

Peizerat was named a Chevalier of the National Order of Merit (France) in 1998 and a Chevalier of the Legion of Honour in 2003. He has done some choreography for other skaters.

Post-skating career
In 2003, Peizerat founded a consulting firm, Soléus. He has also worked for Eurosport, interviewing athletes.

In 2010, Peizerat was elected regional councillor on the list of the Socialist Party in the Rhone Alpes region and was subsequently appointed Councillor Delegate in charge of sports in the Regional Executive headed by Jean-Jack Queyranne.

Programs

With Anissina

With Morel

Competitive highlights

With Anissina

With Morel

References

External links

Official Website GwendalPeizerat.com

Anissina/Peizerat (English)

1972 births
Living people
People from Bron
French male ice dancers
Olympic figure skaters of France
Figure skaters at the 1998 Winter Olympics
Figure skaters at the 2002 Winter Olympics
Olympic gold medalists for France
Olympic bronze medalists for France
Olympic medalists in figure skating
World Figure Skating Championships medalists
European Figure Skating Championships medalists
World Junior Figure Skating Championships medalists
Medalists at the 2002 Winter Olympics
Medalists at the 1998 Winter Olympics
European champions for France
Emlyon Business School alumni
Season-end world number one figure skaters
Regional councillors of Auvergne-Rhône-Alpes
Sportspeople from Lyon Metropolis